HMS Northumberland was a 70-gun third-rate ship of the line of the Royal Navy, built at Deptford Dockyard and launched in 1705.

British service
She was rebuilt twice during her career, firstly at Woolwich Dockyard, where she was reconstructed according to the 1719 Establishment and relaunched on 13 July 1721. Her second rebuild was also carried out at Woolwich Dockyard, where she was reconstructed as a 64-gun third rate according to the 1741 proposals of the 1719 Establishment, and relaunched on 17 October 1743.

Northumberland was captured during the action of 8 May 1744 by the French ships Mars commanded by Étienne Perier and Content commanded by the Comte de Conflans. She was subsequently taken into the French navy as Northumberland, before being renamed Atlas in 1766.

French service

Fate
She sank in February 1781 off the coast of Ushant.

Notes

References

 
 

 

Ships of the line of the Royal Navy
Ships built in Deptford
1700s ships
Captured ships